The Charleston Southern Buccaneers football program is the intercollegiate American football team for Charleston Southern University located in the U.S. state of South Carolina. The team competes in the NCAA Division I Football Championship Subdivision (FCS) and are members of the Big South Conference. Charleston Southern's first football team was fielded in 1991. The team plays its home games at the 4,000 seat Buccaneer Field in North Charleston, South Carolina and are currently coached by Gabe Giardina.

History

The Charleston Southern football team began as a club football team in 1989 before moving to NCAA Division 3 status in 1991, which is a non-scholarship division. After NCAA rule changes required all sports to be in the same division, the Buccaneers moved from Division 3 to Division 1 in 1993, literally overnight, as the other campus programs were Division 1. This caused some challenges for the new program, as they faced off with more established and better funded programs. In 1996, the Bucs went 1–10 with a lone win vs West Virginia State. Wins were scarce, and in 1997, Head Coach David Dowd hired defensive coordinator Todd Knight from Gardner-Webb University. The two coaches oversaw a slow improvement that began with a large recruiting class in 1997, and move to 34 scholarships being offered. That team would struggle to a 1–9 record, with a lone win vs Tusculum College. The opening game was a 30–7 loss to top 10 ranked East Tennessee State, followed by a heart-breaking loss at then No. 22 ranked South Carolina State. In that game, the Buccaneers led 12–6 with less than 1:30 to play, with SC State driving inside the 40 yard line. On a 4th and short, CSU hit the SC State QB to cause a fumble which the Bucs recovered and began to run with, only to then fumble the ball back, and SC State would score the game winning TD on the ensuing drive. The 1997 team struggled to recover from that loss. A tragic loss was part of that season, as freshman running back Kevin Keyes was murdered near his hometown of Goose Creek, SC. 

The 2000 CSU team beat Liberty for the first time 25-0, and lost to Samford in OT to finish 5-6.

Jay Mills era (2003–2012)
Jay Mills came to Charleston Southern from Harvard University, and had spent time coaching at several other places, including Boise State, Notre Dame and Minnesota-Morris. His system shifted from CSU's traditional power based, pro style offense to a spread offense. Several starters were dismissed from the team for various situations, and most of the coaching staff was changed. His first season was seen by many as a disaster, as the Bucs stumbled to a 1–11 record, with the lone win being over West Virginia State. The season included blowout losses to The Citadel, Gardner Webb, VMI, James Madison and Coastal Carolina. However, Coach Mills used the 2003 season to break-in a freshman quarterback named Colin Drafts. While this was to be an extremely difficult season of transition, it would provide the groundwork for a remarkable turnaround, and the emergence of one of the most prolific offensive players in CSU and Big South Conference history. In 2004, CSU saw a game canceled vs The Citadel due to a looming hurricane, and the Bucs were able to post a 5–5 record, the first non-losing season in CSU history. Colin Drafts began to emerge as a star quarterback, as did running back Travis Mays and linebacker Joshua Mitchell. Wide receiver Eddie Gadson would also emerge from walk-on to All Big South Conference in one season. The 12 months following the end of the 2004 season would be one that no fan or team member would have predicted.

Jamey Chadwell era (2013–2016)
Head Coach Jamey Chadwell took over the program after the retirement of Jay Mills following the 2012 season. The program has reached new heights with most wins in a season (10) in 2013, a win over national FCS power Appalachian State, back to back conference championships in 2015 and 2016, 4 straight wins over The Citadel, and two home wins over Coastal Carolina. In 2016, the buccaneers took on 5 time reigning FCS champion North Dakota State into over time and suffered a tough loss (24-17). While the loss was hard on the team, it showed the strides made by this once small football program into what it is today. In 2017, Jamey Chadwell accepted a position at Coastal Carolina and Mark Tucker took the helm. CSU has been consistently ranked in the FCS top 25 since 2013.

Mark Tucker era (2017–2018)
Former quarterbacks coach Mark Tucker took over the football program in January, 2017 following the departure of Head Coach Jamey Chadwell. Following several coaching changes and a strong recruiting class, Coach Tucker hoped to have continued success with The Buccaneers. CSU would follow up the 2016 campaign with a 6-5 record in 2017. Following a 5-6 season in 2018, Mark Tucker resigned as the Head Coach on December 7, 2018. He compiled an 11-11 record.

Autry Denson era (2019–present)
Notre Dame running backs coach Autry Denson was named head coach in January 2019.

Conferences

Classifications
1991–1992: NCAA Division III
1992–present: NCAA Division I–AA/FCS

Notable former players
 Charles James
 Maurice Price

Championships

Conference championships

† Co-champions

FCS playoffs results
The Buccaneers have appeared in the FCS playoffs two times. Their record is 1–2.

Rivalries

The Citadel
These two schools first met on the football field in 2002 and it has become a rivalry recently under CSU head Coach Jamey Chadwell, and is currently being continued through current CSU HC Autry Denson. The Buccaneers won four in a row under Chadwell including two wins in 2015, as CSU took down The Citadel in a second round NCAA Playoff game at Buccaneer Field. Under Head Coaches Mark Tucker and Autry Denson, the Bucs have won once and lost twice to the Bulldogs.

Citadel leads the series 7-6.
2021 - CSU @ Citadel - W, 38-21
2019 - CSU @ Citadel - L, 13-22
2018 - CSU @ Citadel - L, 14-43
2015 – Citadel @ CSU – W, 14–6 (NCAA Division 1 Playoff Game [2nd Round])
2015 – CSU @ Citadel – W, 33–20
2014 – Citadel @ CSU – W, 20–18
2013 – CSU @ Citadel – W, 32–29
2012 – CSU @ Citadel – L, 49–14
2007 – CSU @ Citadel – L, 35–14
2006 – CSU @ Citadel – W, 38–35
2005 – CSU @ Citadel – L, 28–14
2003 – CSU @ Citadel – L, 64–10
2002 – CSU @ Citadel – L, 53–19 (First Meeting)

Coastal Carolina
These two schools first met on the football field in 2003 and it has been a rivalry since Charleston Southern defeated Coastal Carolina 34–27 in 2005 to win a share of the Big South Championship that Coastal had already clinched. CSU got the first shutout of the series with their 24–0 win in 2008. In 2015, Coastal Carolina, then ranked Number 1 nationally, was defeated by the 19th ranked Buccaneers 33–25, giving Charleston Southern the sole lead in the Big South Conference.

Coastal Carolina leads the series 8–6.
2016 – CSU @ Coastal – W, 59–58 (2 OT)
2015 – Coastal @ CSU – W, 33–25
2014 – CSU @ Coastal – L, 43–22
2013 – Coastal @ CSU – W, 31–26
2012 – CSU @ Coastal – L, 41–20
2011 – Coastal @ CSU – L, 45–38
2010 – CSU @ Coastal – L, 70–3
2009 – Coastal @ CSU – W, 30–23
2008 – CSU @ Coastal – W, 24–0
2007 – Coastal @ CSU – L, 41–2
2006 – CSU @ Coastal – L, 31–17
2005 – Coastal @ CSU – W, 34–27 (2 OT)
2004 – CSU @ Coastal – L, 56–28
2003 – Coastal @ CSU – L, 48–14 (First Meeting)

Charleston Southern vs In-State NCAA Division I schools

Charleston Southern vs. FBS teams

References

External links
 

 
American football teams established in 1991
1991 establishments in South Carolina